The Apostolic Vicariate of Saxony (Sachsen in German) was a Latin Catholic pre-diocesan missionary jurisdiction in northern Germany, within the Holy Roman Empire and surviving it.

History 
Established in 1743 as Apostolic Vicariate of Saxony on German territory split off from the vast Apostolic Vicariate of Nordic Missions. Although its status entitled it to titular bishops, the incumbents until 1800 were not ordained into the episcopate.

Suppressed on 1921.06.24, its territory being reassigned to (re-)establish a Roman Catholic Diocese of Meißen.

Ordinaries 
Apostolic Vicars of Saxony (all Roman Rite)
 Father Ludwig Liegeritz, Jesuits (S.J.) (1743–1749)
 Leo Rauch, S.J. (1749–1763)
 Augustin Eggs, S.J. (1763–1764)
 Franz Herz, S.J. (1764–1800)
 Johann Aloys Schneider (1801.01.29 – death 1818.12.22), Titular Bishop of Argos (1801.01.29 – 1818.12.22)
 Ignaz Bernhard Mauermann (1819.01.31 – death 1841.09.14), Titular Bishop of Pella (1819.01.31 – 1841.09.14), also Apostolic Prefect of Lausitz (Lusatia) (Germany) (1831 – 1841.09.14)
 Franz Laurenz Mauermann, Benedictine Order (O.S.B.) (1841.11.26 – death 1845.10.25), Titular Bishop of Ramata (1841.11.26 – 1845.10.25)
 Joseph Dittrich (1846.04.20 – death 1853.10.05), Titular Bishop of Corycus (1846.04.20 – 1853.10.05), also Apostolic Prefect of Lausitz (Lusatia) (1846.04.20 – 1853.10.05)
 Ludwig Forwerk (1854.07.11 – death 1875.01.08), Titular Bishop of Leontopolis in Bithynia (1854.07.11 – 1875.01.08), also Apostolic Prefect of Lausitz (Lusatia) (1854.07.11 – 1875.01.08)
 Franz Bernert (1876.01.28 – death 1890.03.18), Titular Bishop of Azotus (1876.01.28 – 1890.03.18), also Apostolic Prefect of Lausitz (Lusatia) (1876.01.28 – 1890.03.18)
 Ludwig Wahl (1890.07.11 – retired 1900), Titular Bishop of Cocussus (1890.07.11 – 1905.06.06), also Apostolic Prefect of Lausitz (Lusatia) (1890.07.11 – 1900)
  (1906.04.04 – death 1914.09.05), Titular Bishop of Abila (1906.04.04 – 1914.09.05), also Apostolic Prefect of Lausitz (Lusatia) (1906.04.04 – 1914.09.05)
 Franz Löbmann (1915.01.30 – death 1920.12.04), Titular Bishop of Priene (1915.01.30 – 1920.12.04), also Apostolic Prefect of Lausitz (Lusatia) (1915.01.30 – 1920.12.04)
 Apostolic Administrator (1920–1921) Msgr. Jakub Skala, no other office recorded

Source and External links 
 GCatholic with incumbent bio links

Apostolic vicariates
Former Roman Catholic dioceses in Europe